The Ligue de Hockey Junior AA Saguenay-Lac-St-Jean or Saguenay-Lac-St-Jean Junior "AA" Hockey League is a Junior "AA" (Junior "B" Canada-Wide) ice hockey league in the Province of Quebec, Canada.  The league is sanctioned by Hockey Quebec and Hockey Canada.

The champion of the league competes annually for the Coupe Dodge, the Provincial Championship of Quebec.

Teams

Champions
2006 Jonquìère Marquis
2007 Normandin Éperviers
2008 Métabetchouan Royals
2009 La Baie National
2010 Jonquìère Marquis
2011 Jonquìère Marquis
2012 Jonquìère Marquis
2013 Normandin Éperviers
2014 Jonquìère Marquis
2015 Jonquìère Marquis
2016 Alma Aiglons
2017 Jonquière Marquis
2018 Jonquière Marquis

External links
Saguenay-Lac-St-Jean Junior "AA" Website
Complete Junior "AA" Standing
Aiglons d'Alma Webpage

B
B
Organizations based in Quebec
Alma, Quebec
Hockey Quebec